John Vivian Fitzhenry Lusby (1913–1980), known as "Jack", was an Australian cartoonist, journalist and short story writer who served as a pilot in the Royal Australian Airforce during World War II.

Career and works

Lusby was born at Drummoyne in Sydney in 1913. His parents were John Lusby and Caroline Lusby (née Fitzhenry), who had six children, of whom he was the eldest: John, Maurice, Gwenyth, Robert, Judith and Elizabeth. His father was a school teacher, whose job kept the family moving from country town to country town until they settled in Sydney in time for the  Great Depression.

Lusby's cartoons appeared in The Bulletin from around 1936 and he worked as cartoonist for Brisbane's The Courier Mail from 1945–51. He also contributed works to the Minties moments series.

His early short stories appeared in Smith’s Weekly and The Bulletin under the pseudonym, 'Freddie'. His stories were later republished in anthologies such as Coast to Coast, 1959–60; The Bulletin Christmas Edition, 1958; The Penguin Book of Australian Short Stories (Vol 2); Selected Australian Stories (1963); Australian Short Stories, Second Series (1963); and Short Stories from the Second World War (1982).

War service

Lusby enlisted in the Royal Australian Airforce in 1941, was posted with the No. 3 Squadron RAAF to fight in North Africa and Middle East, and was 'loaned out' to No. 458 Squadron. During the war, Lusby married his wife Sheila. His war journal was published online in 2012 by the 3 Squadron Association. 

His siblings also gave distinguished service in the war effort: brother Maurice Lusby was sent to Washington and London as Australian Scientific Research Liaison Officer. Sister Gwen commanded the Medical Division at Concord Military Hospital - one of the first women Majors in the Australian Army. Youngest brother Robert Lusby was captured with the 2/30th Battalion at Singapore and died on the Burma Railway, while sister Judith was recruited into naval intelligence with the WRANS.

Selected works

Jack's War: A Pilot's World War II Journal by Jack Lusby, published by Maria Simms, 2012
Thumb’s Up by Jack Lusby], published in Sydney by Frank Johnson in 1941.[https://catalogue.nla.gov.au/Record/2480517 Grin with Jack Lusby published in Sydney by Frank Johnson in 1945.
The Penguin Book of Australian Short Stories (Vol 2)

See also

Gwen Fleming
Justin Fleming
Rosemary Follett

References

External links
Jack Lusby bio on Design & Art Australia Online. 
Jack Lusby on Trove

1913 births
1980 deaths
Australian cartoonists
Australian comics artists